Rodolfo Borrell Marco (born 31 January 1971) is a Spanish football coach, who is currently the assistant coach at Manchester City F.C.

Management career

Barcelona
Borrell was a youth coach at Barcelona, where he coached some of the world's finest emerging talent at their renowned 'La Masia' Academy. Borrell still possesses one of the most successful records in history of Youth Football coaching at F.C. Barcelona. He worked at Barcelona between 1995 and 2008, where he formed part of the team that developed Leo Messi, Gerard Pique and Cesc Fabregas.

English Premier League
In July 2009, Liverpool agreed a deal to bring in Barcelona youth coaches Rodolfo Borrell and Pep Segura to the club. In the mid-late 2000s, first team coach Rafael Benitez made it a priority of his to improve the club's Academy, hence why Rodolfo was brought in. After two successful seasons as head coach of the U18s, Rodolfo became Liverpool's Reserve Team Head Coach in May 2011."It's a great honour for me. The club have shown they have great confidence in my ability and I am happy. It is a job that means my name will sit forever alongside the likes of Bob Paisley, Joe Fagan, Roy Evans, Phil Thompson and Sammy Lee. They are big names in Liverpool's history and it is also an important role because it is the final step in the Academy. The players need to be ready if they are to make the move into the first-team set-up and I am going to fight for that."  After a two-year spell as head coach of Liverpool U18s and an eighteen-month stint in charge of the Reserve side, he then became head of academy coaching at Liverpool. Recruited in the summer of 2009 by Rafael Benitez, he and compatriot Jose Segura helped revolutionise Liverpool's ailing Academy. Having failed to provide the first team with a key player since Steven Gerrard who made his debut in 1998, the academy produced numerous talents since Borrell's appointment. 

In March 2014, Rodolfo was appointed as Manchester City global technical director. In July 2016, Manchester City appointed him as 1st team assistant coach to Pep Guardiola. Rodolfo was promoted by Guardiola from head of academy coaching, a role he had held since July 2014.

References

1971 births
Living people
Sportspeople from Barcelona
Liverpool F.C. non-playing staff
Manchester City F.C. non-playing staff
Association football coaches
Spanish football managers
Spanish expatriate football managers
Expatriate football managers in Greece
Spanish expatriate sportspeople in Greece
Iraklis Thessaloniki F.C. managers